Frea paralbicans is a species of beetle in the family Cerambycidae. It was described by Stephan von Breuning in 1979.

References

paralbicans
Beetles described in 1979